Marymount College, Tarrytown (also known as Marymount College of Fordham University) was a women's college in the United States which eventually became part of Fordham University. The Marymount campus was located in Tarrytown, New York. The last class graduated in 2007, and the campus was sold in 2008.

History

Johanna Butler was born on July 22, 1860, in County Kilkenny, Ireland, the daughter of prosperous farmers John and Ellen Forrestal Butler. At the age of sixteen, she joined the French congregation of the Religious of the Sacred Heart of Mary (RSHM) at Béziers, taking the name "Marie Joseph". In 1903, Butler was appointed superior of the congregation's convent and school on Long Island. In 1907, her cousin James Butler donated land near Tarrytown, New York for the founding of the college. The college was founded as an independent girls' boarding school by the Religious of the Sacred Heart of Mary (RSHM) to "create a place of learning where women could grow and where they could receive an education that would prepare them for positions of leadership and influence in the world." In February 1908, the school opened with six students. By 1918, the school offered an advanced two-year degree. In 1919, it obtained a provisional college charter. The charter became permanent in 1924, which is the year that Marymount began granting baccalaureate degrees. Marymount College at Tarrytown was the first of several colleges founded by the RSHM (Marymount colleges). It was the first women's college in the United States to offer a study abroad program.

In 2000, Marymount entered into an agreement to consolidate with Fordham University. The college was renamed Marymount College of Fordham University. In October 2005, after two years of study, Fordham announced its plans to close Marymount in 2007. At the time, John N. Tognino, chair of the Fordham University Board of Trustees, explained that "despite the very best efforts of the faculty, administration and staff, it is no longer academically or financially feasible to continue to operate Marymount College as a separate school within the University".

In August 2007, Fordham announced it would sell the Marymount campus. The decision disappointed many alumnae, as the university had purchased the college with the promise that it would try to continue to operate it as a women's institution. The University claimed unjustifiable and disproportionate costs to maintain the large campus as reason for closure. Skeptics saw the acquisition of the college as a real estate venture. On February 17, 2008, Fordham announced the sale of the campus for $27 million to EF Education, a chain of private language-instruction schools.

See also
Marymount colleges

References

Tarrytown, New York
Former Catholic universities and colleges in the United States
Former women's universities and colleges in the United States
Defunct Catholic universities and colleges in the United States
Marymount College, Tarrytown
Educational institutions established in 1907
Educational institutions disestablished in 2007
Schools in Westchester County, New York
1907 establishments in New York (state)